The Ministry of Highways, Ports and Shipping was a Sri Lankan government ministry responsible for the governance, implementation, creation and development of Ports including Colombo, Galle and Trincomalee ports, Highways including Southern expressway, Colombo Outer Circular expressway,  Katunayake expressway and their transport services. It was reorganized as two separate ministries, the Ministry of Ports and Shipping and Ministry of Higher Education and Highways following the formation of the Sirisena cabinet in January 2015.

History
It was created in 1960, at the Second Dudley Senanayake cabinet as the Ministry of Nationalised Services, Shipping & Transport. It included most of the subjects of the current ministry. 
Then it was renamed as the Ministry of Commerce, Trade, Food & Shipping at the First Sirimavo Bandaranaike cabinet. 
The highways section was included in the Ministry of Irrigation, Power & Highways in both, Second Sirimavo Bandaranaike cabinet and Jayewardene cabinet. In the Jayewardene Cabinet, the shipping section was included in the Ministry of Shipping, Aviation & Tourism. 
In the Premadasa cabinet, the ports and shipping sections were included in the Ministry of Ports & Shipping and the Ministry of Trade & Shipping and the highways section was included in the Ministry of Transport & Highways. 
In the Kumaratunge cabinet (2000) the ports section was included in the Ministry of Ports Development & Development of the South, the highways section was included in the Ministry of Highways, the shipping section was included in the Ministry of Internal & International Trade Commerce, Muslim Religious Affairs & Shipping Development. 
The highways section and to some extent the shipping section was included in Ministry of Transport, Highways & Aviation of Ranil Wickramasinghe cabinet.
The highways section was included in the Ministry of Highways & Road Development and the ports and shipping sections were included in the Ministry of Ports & Aviation in the First Mahinda Rajapaksha cabinet.

The name "Ministry of Highways, Ports and Shipping" was created in Second Mahinda Rajapaksha cabinet in 2010.

Officials
 Minister of Ports and Highways (Cabinet)— the President of the Democratic Socialist Republic of Sri Lanka, Mahinda Rajapaksha. 
 Project Minister of Ports and Highways — Nirmala Kotalawala MP
 Project Minister of Ports and Highways — Rohitha AbeygunawardenaMP
 Permanent Secretary — R.W.R.Pemasiri.

Current and past ministers 
Parties

Duties and Functions
 Formulation of policies programmes and projects in regard to the subjects of Ports, Highways and Expressways and all subjects that come under the purview of the ministry.
 Direction of the implementation of such policies, programmes and projects within time lines agreed with the national planning authorities and within budgeted resources, with a view to achieving relevant objectives.
 Provision of all public services that come under the purview of the Ministry in an efficient and people friendly manner.
 Reforming of all systems and procedures to ensure the conduct of business in an efficient manner deploying modern management techniques and technology where applicable while eliminating corruption and waste
 Provision and Maintenance in optimum condition of a high quality network of national highways and other principal road
 Implementation of the Maga Neguma Rural Road Development Programme
 Improvement of clear co-ordination process to cover all road project implementing agencies for an integration development and monitoring collection of road user charges in respect of National Policy
 Formulation of Programmes and Projects based on National Policy in respect of Provincial and Local Authority roads and co-ordination and monitoring of such programs and projects
 Road Development activities connected to Kottawa, Kaduwela and Kadawatha Township Development Project
 Development and Administration of ports and harbours, light houses and beacons, oil installation other than those belong to Admiralty
 Arbitration of disputes between shipping Service providers and users
 Establish  rules of competition  for shipping Services
 Assist and ensure consultation between shipping service providers and users
 Receiving of Wrecks and Ocean salvages
 Administration of Shipping Development Fund
 Freight and shipping Services
 Coastwise passenger traffic

Departments
Departments, with their heads :
 Road Development Authority and its Subsidiaries and Associates, headed by  Director General, W.A.S. Weerasinghe
 Road Development Fund
 Sri Lanka Ports Authority and its Subsidiaries and Associates, headed by chairman, Priyath B. Wickrama
 Ceylon Shipping Corporation Ltd and its Subsidiaries and Associates, headed by chairman, Vice Admiral Jayanath Colombage
 Director General's Office of Merchant Shipping, headed by Director General, A W Seneviratne

See also
 Minister of Ports and Highways
 Ministry of Finance and Planning (Sri Lanka)
 Ministries of Sri Lanka

References

External links
 Government of Sri Lanka
 Ministry of Highways,Ports and Shipping
 Road Development Authority
 Ceylon Shipping Corporation Ltd
 Sri Lanka Ports Authority
 Director General's Office of Merchant Shipping

1960 establishments in Ceylon
Highways, Ports and Shipping
Defunct transport organisations based in Sri Lanka
Ministries established in 1960
Shipping in Sri Lanka
Sri Lanka